The Westchester is an upscale shopping mall located in downtown White Plains, New York. It is anchored by Neiman Marcus and New York State's first Nordstrom, the fourth in the New York City metropolitan area to open after locations in Short Hills, Menlo Park, and Paramus, New Jersey.

History
Opened in 1995, The Westchester was built on the site of one of the first suburban branch department stores in the United States, a B. Altman & Co. store which opened in 1930, as well as the terminal for the New York, Westchester and Boston Railway  White Plains branch. B. Altman's was located where Nordstrom is now situated. The mall was built adjacent to the (once) freestanding location of Neiman Marcus, which originally opened in 1972 as the only out-of-town location of its sister chain, New York-based Bergdorf Goodman. The Westchester is located within close proximity to the Sonesta Hotel (Formerly The Crowne Plaza Hotel), The Opus Westchester Hotel (Formerly The Ritz-Carlton Hotel), The Source at White Plains, The White Plains Pavilion, City Center at White Plains, and the soon to close Galleria at White Plains. The mall's food court, located on the fourth floor, is known as Savor Westchester. The food court includes Melt Shop and Shake Shack. The fourth floor used to have a typical food court and a large F.A.O. Schwarz that closed in the early 2000s. Starting in February 2016, the mall underwent its largest renovation since opening in 1995, which included installing a new façade, tiling and carpeting.

References

External links
The Westchester
Westchester Mall Review

1995 establishments in New York (state)
Shopping malls established in 1995
Simon Property Group
Shopping malls in New York (state)
Buildings and structures in White Plains, New York
Tourist attractions in Westchester County, New York
Shopping malls in the New York metropolitan area